Vladimir Fyodorovich Chernyshov (born 5 November 1948) is a retired Russian heavyweight boxer who won the European championships in 1971. In 1972 he was about to retire and got injured at the national championships; he was therefore not selected for the 1972 Olympics.

References

1948 births
Living people
Russian male boxers
Heavyweight boxers